Scutellaria baicalensis, with the common name Baikal skullcap or Chinese skullcap, is a species of flowering plant in the family Lamiaceae.

Distribution
The plant is native to China, Korea, Mongolia, and Russia in the Russian Far East and Siberia.

Traditional Chinese medicine
It is one of the 50 fundamental herbs used in traditional Chinese medicine, where it has the name huángqín.  As a Chinese traditional medicine, huang qin usually refers to the dried root of S. baicalensis Georgi, S. viscidula Bge., S. amoena C.H. Wright, and S. ikoninkovii Ju.

Phytochemicals

Several phytochemicals have been isolated from the root; baicalein, baicalin, wogonin, norwogonin, oroxylin A and β-sitosterol are the major ones.

Names
As the term 'skullcap' is applied to over 200 plant varieties, the scientific name is used. Sometimes, Scutellaria lateriflora (North American skullcap) is mistaken for S. baicalensis.

Adverse effects
There have been several reports and small case series of acute liver injury with jaundice arising 1 to 3 months after starting herbal or dietary supplements containing S. baicalensis.

See also
 Piper methysticum (kava), another anxiolytic GABAergic plant
 Valeriana officinalis (valerian), a sedative GABAergic plant

References

External links

Scutellaria baicalensis List of Chemicals (Dr. Duke's Databases)
Scutellaria baicalensis (Plants for a Future)

baicalensis
Flora of China
Flora of Korea
Flora of Mongolia
Flora of the Russian Far East
Flora of Siberia
Medicinal plants of Asia
Plants used in traditional Chinese medicine
Anxiolytics
Dopamine reuptake inhibitors
GABAA receptor positive allosteric modulators